A Red Scare is the promotion of a widespread fear of a potential rise of communism, socialism, anarchism or other leftist ideologies by a society or state. The term is most often used to refer to two periods in the history of the United States which are referred to by this name. The First Red Scare, which occurred immediately after World War I, revolved around a perceived threat from the American labor movement, anarchist revolution, and political radicalism. The Second Red Scare, which occurred immediately after World War II, was preoccupied with the perception that national or foreign communists were infiltrating or subverting American society and the federal government. The name refers to the red flag as a common symbol of communism.

First Red Scare (1917–1920)

The first Red Scare in the United States accompanied the Russian Revolution of 1917 and subsequent  communist revolutions in Europe and beyond.  Citizens of the United States in the years of World War I (1914-1918) were intensely patriotic; anarchist and left-wing social agitation aggravated national, social, and political tensions. Political scientist and former member of the Communist Party USA  Murray B. Levin wrote that the Red Scare was "a nationwide anti-radical hysteria provoked by a mounting fear and anxiety that a Bolshevik revolution in America was imminent—a revolution that would change Church, home, marriage, civility, and the American way of Life". News media exacerbated such fears, channeling them into  anti-foreign sentiment due to the lively debate among recent immigrants from Europe regarding various forms of anarchism as possible solutions to widespread poverty.  The Industrial Workers of the World (IWW), also known as the Wobblies, backed several labor strikes in 1916 and 1917.  These strikes covered a wide range of industries including steel working, shipbuilding, coal mining, copper mining, and others necessary for wartime activities. 

After World War I ended (November 1918), the number of strikes increased to record levels in 1919, with more than 3,600 separate strikes by a wide range of workers, e.g. steel workers, railroad shop workers, and the Boston police department. The press portrayed these worker strikes as "radical threats to American society" inspired by "left-wing, foreign agents provocateurs". The IWW and those sympathetic to workers claimed that the press "misrepresented legitimate labor strikes" as "crimes against society", "conspiracies against the government", and "plots to establish communism". Opponents of labor viewed strikes as an extension of the radical, anarchist foundations of the IWW, which contends that all workers should be united as a social class and that capitalism and the wage system should be abolished.

In June 1917, as a response to World War I, Congress passed the  Espionage Act to prevent any information relating to national defense from being used to harm the United States or to aid her enemies. The Wilson administration used this act to make anything "urging treason" a "nonmailable matter". Due to the Espionage Act and the then Postmaster General Albert S. Burleson, 74 separate newspapers were not being mailed.

In April 1919, authorities discovered a plot for mailing 36 bombs to prominent members of the U.S. political and economic  establishment: J. P. Morgan Jr., John D. Rockefeller,  Supreme Court Justice  Oliver Wendell Holmes, U.S. Attorney General Alexander Mitchell Palmer, and immigration officials. On June 2, 1919, in eight cities, eight bombs exploded simultaneously. One target was the Washington, D.C., house of U.S. Attorney General Palmer, where the explosion killed the bomber, who (evidence indicated) was an Italian-American radical from  Philadelphia, Pennsylvania. Afterwards, Palmer ordered the U.S. Justice Department to launch the Palmer Raids (1919–21). He deported 249 Russian immigrants on the "Soviet Ark", formed the General Intelligence Unit - a precursor to the Federal Bureau of Investigation (FBI) - within the Department of Justice, and used federal agents to jail more than  5,000 citizens and to search homes without respecting their constitutional rights.

In 1918, before the bombings,  President Woodrow Wilson had pressured Congress to legislate the anti-anarchist Sedition Act of 1918 to protect wartime morale by deporting putatively undesirable political people. Law professor David D. Cole reports that President Wilson's "federal government consistently targeted alien radicals, deporting them... for their speech or associations, making little effort to distinguish terrorists from ideological dissidents". President Wilson used the Sedition Act of 1918 to limit the exercise of free speech by criminalizing language deemed disloyal to the United States government.

Initially, the press praised the raids; The Washington Post stated: "There is no time to waste on hairsplitting over [the] infringement of liberty", and The New York Times wrote that the injuries inflicted upon the arrested were "souvenirs of the new attitude of aggressiveness which had been assumed by the Federal agents against Reds and suspected-Reds". In the event, twelve publicly prominent lawyers characterized the Palmer Raids as unconstitutional. The critics included future Supreme Court Justice Felix Frankfurter, who published A Report on the Illegal Practices of The United States Department of Justice, documenting systematic violations of the Fourth, Fifth, Sixth, and Eighth Amendments to the U.S. Constitution via Palmer-authorized "illegal acts" and "wanton violence". Defensively, Palmer then warned that a government-deposing left-wing revolution would begin on 1 May 1920—May Day, the International Workers' Day. When it failed to happen, he was ridiculed and lost much credibility. Strengthening the legal criticism of Palmer was that fewer than 600 deportations were substantiated with evidence, out of the thousands of resident aliens arrested and deported. In July 1920, Palmer's once-promising Democratic Party bid for the U.S. presidency failed. Wall Street was bombed on September 16, 1920, near Federal Hall National Memorial and the JP Morgan Bank. Although both anarchists and communists were suspected as being responsible for the bombing, ultimately no individuals were indicted for the bombing, in which 38 died and 141 were injured.

In 1919–20, several states enacted "criminal syndicalism" laws outlawing advocacy of violence in effecting and securing social change. The restrictions included limitations on free speech.  Passage of these laws, in turn, provoked aggressive police investigation of the accused persons, their jailing, and deportation for being suspected of being either communist or left-wing. Regardless of ideological gradation, the Red Scare did not distinguish between communism, anarchism, socialism, or social democracy. This aggressive crackdown on certain ideologies resulted in many supreme-court cases over free speech. In the 1919 case of Schenk v. United States, the Supreme Court, introducing the  clear-and-present-danger test, effectively deemed the Espionage Act of 1917 and the Sedition Act of 1918 constitutional.

Second Red Scare (1947–1957)

The second Red Scare occurred after World War II (1939–1945), and is known as "McCarthyism" after its best-known advocate, Senator Joseph McCarthy. McCarthyism coincided with an increased and widespread fear of communist espionage that was consequent of the increasing tension in the Cold War through the Soviet occupation of Eastern Europe, the Berlin Blockade (1948–49), the end of the Chinese Civil War, the confessions of spying for the Soviet Union that were made by several high-ranking U.S. government officials, and the outbreak of the Korean War.

Internal causes of the anti-communist fear
The events of the late 1940s, the early 1950s—the trial of Ethel and Julius Rosenberg (1953), the trial of Alger Hiss, the Iron Curtain (1945–1991) around Eastern Europe, and the Soviet Union's first nuclear weapon test in 1949 (RDS-1)—surprised the American public, influencing popular opinion about U.S. national security, which, in turn, was connected to the fear that the Soviet Union would drop nuclear bombs on the United States, and fear of the Communist Party of the United States of America (CPUSA).

In Canada, the 1946 Kellock–Taschereau Commission investigated espionage after top-secret documents concerning RDX, radar and other weapons were handed over to the Soviets by a domestic spy-ring.

At the House Un-American Activities Committee, former CPUSA members and NKVD spies, Elizabeth Bentley and Whittaker Chambers, testified that Soviet spies and communist sympathizers had penetrated the U.S. government before, during and after World War II. Other U.S. citizen spies confessed to their acts of espionage in situations where the statute of limitations on prosecuting them had run out. In 1949, anti-communist fear, and fear of American traitors, was aggravated by the Chinese Communists winning the Chinese Civil War against the Western-sponsored Kuomintang, their founding of the Communist China, and later Chinese intervention in the Korean War (1950–53) against U.S. ally South Korea.

A few of the events during the Red Scare were also due to a power struggle between director of FBI J. Edgar Hoover and the Central Intelligence Agency. Hoover had instigated and aided some of the investigations of members of the CIA with "leftist" history, like Cord Meyer. This conflict could also be traced back to the conflict between Hoover and William J. Donovan, going back to the first Red Scare, but especially during World War II. Donovan ran the OSS (CIA's predecessor). They had differing opinions on the nature of the alliance with the Soviet Union, conflicts over jurisdiction, conflicts of personality, the OSS hiring of communists and criminals as agents, etc. 

Historian Richard Powers distinguishes two main forms of anti-communism during the period, liberal anti-communism and countersubversive anti-communism. The countersubversives, he argues, derived from a pre-WWII isolationist tradition on the right. Liberal anti-communists believed that political debate was enough to show Communists as disloyal and irrelevant, while countersubversive anticommunists believed that Communists had to be exposed and punished. At times, countersubversive anticommunists accused liberals of being "equally destructive" as Communists due to an alleged lack of religious values or supposed "red web" infiltration into the New Deal.  

Much evidence for Soviet espionage existed, according to Democratic Senator and historian Daniel Moynihan, with the Venona project consisting of "overwhelming proof of the activities of Soviet spy networks in America, complete with names, dates, places, and deeds." However, Moynihan argued that because sources like the Venona project were kept secret for so long, "ignorant armies clashed by night".  With McCarthy advocating an extremist view, the discussion of communist subversion was made into a civil rights issue instead of a counterintelligence one. This historiographical perspective is shared by historians John Earl Haynes and Robert Louis Benson. While President Truman formulated the Truman Doctrine against Soviet expansion, it is possible he was not fully informed of the Venona intercepts, leaving him unaware of the domestic extent of espionage, according to Moynihan and Benson.

History

Early years 
By the 1930s, communism had become an attractive economic ideology, particularly among labor leaders and intellectuals. By 1939, the CPUSA had about 50,000 members. In 1940, soon after World War II began in Europe, the U.S. Congress legislated the Alien Registration Act (aka the Smith Act, 18 USC § 2385) making it a crime to "knowingly or willfully advocate, abet, advise or teach the duty, necessity, desirability or propriety of overthrowing the Government of the United States or of any State by force or violence, or for anyone to organize any association which teaches, advises or encourages such an overthrow, or for anyone to become a member of or to affiliate with any such association"—and required Federal registration of all foreign nationals. Although principally deployed against communists, the Smith Act was also used against right-wing political threats such as the German-American Bund, and the perceived racial disloyalty of the Japanese-American population (cf. hyphenated-Americans).

After the non-aggression pact was signed between Hitler and Stalin in 1939 the communist party in the United States took an anti-war approach and were consequently treated with more hostility than they had been previously by the public because they were seen as to be working with the Nazis. However, in 1941, after Nazi Germany invaded the Soviet Union, the CPUSA's official position became pro-war, opposing labor strikes in the weapons industry and supporting the U.S. war effort against the Axis Powers. With the slogan "Communism is Twentieth-Century Americanism", the chairman, Earl Browder, advertised the CPUSA's integration to the political mainstream. In contrast, the Trotskyist Socialist Workers Party opposed U.S. participation in the war and supported labor strikes, even in the war-effort industry. For this reason, James P. Cannon and other SWP leaders were convicted per the Smith Act.

Increasing tension 
In March 1947, President Harry S. Truman signed Executive Order 9835, creating the "Federal Employees Loyalty Program" establishing political-loyalty review boards who determined the "Americanism" of Federal Government employees, and requiring that all federal employees to take an oath of loyalty to the United States government. It then recommended termination of those who had confessed to spying for the Soviet Union, as well as some suspected of being "Un-American". This led to more than 2,700 dismissals and 12,000 resignations from the years 1947 to 1956. It also was the template for several state legislatures' loyalty acts, such as California's Levering Act. The House Committee on Un-American Activities was created during the Truman administration as a response to allegations by Republicans of disloyalty in Truman's administration. The House Committee on Un-American Activities (HUAC) and the committees of Senator Joseph McCarthy (R., Wisc.) conducted character investigations of "American communists" (actual and alleged), and their roles in (real and imaginary) espionage, propaganda, and subversion favoring the Soviet Union—in the process revealing the extraordinary breadth of the Soviet spy network in infiltrating the federal government; the process also launched the successful political careers of Richard Nixon and Robert F. Kennedy, as well as that of Joseph McCarthy. The HUAC held a large interest in investigating those in the entertainment industry in Hollywood. They interrogated actors, writers, and producers. The people who cooperated in the investigations got to continue working as they had been, but people who refused to cooperate were blacklisted.

Senator McCarthy stirred up further fear in the United States of communists infiltrating the country by saying that communist spies were omnipresent, and he was America's only salvation, using this fear to increase his own influence. In 1950 Joseph McCarthy addressed the senate, citing 81 separate cases, and made accusations against suspected communists. Although he provided little or no evidence, this prompted the Senate to call for a full investigation.

Senator McCarran introduced the McCarran Internal Security Act of 1950 that was passed by the U.S. Congress and which modified a great deal of law to restrict civil liberties in the name of security. President Truman declared the act a "mockery of the Bill of Rights" and a "long step toward totalitarianism" because it represented a government restriction on the freedom of opinion. He vetoed the act but his veto was overridden by Congress. Much of the bill eventually was repealed.

The formal establishment of the People's Republic of China in 1949 and the beginning of the Korean War in 1950 meant that Asian Americans, especially those of Chinese or Korean descent, came under increasing suspicion by both American civilians and government officials of being Communist sympathizers. Simultaneously, some American politicians saw the prospect of American-educated Chinese students bringing their knowledge back to “Red China” as an unacceptable threat to American national security, and laws such as the China Aid Act of 1950 and the Refugee Relief Act of 1953 gave significant assistance to Chinese students who wished to settle in the United States. Despite being naturalized, however, Chinese immigrants continued to face suspicion of their allegiance. The general effect, according to University of Wisconsin-Madison scholar Qing Liu, was to simultaneously demand that Chinese (and other Asian) students politically support the American government yet avoid engaging directly in politics.

The Second Red Scare profoundly altered the temper of American society. Its later characterizations may be seen as contributory to works of feared communist espionage, such as the film My Son John (1952), about parents' suspicions their son is a spy. Abundant accounts in narrative forms contained themes of the infiltration, subversion, invasion, and destruction of American society by un–American thought. Even a baseball team, the Cincinnati Reds, temporarily renamed themselves the "Cincinnati Redlegs" to avoid the money-losing and career-ruining connotations inherent in being ball-playing "Reds" (communists).

In 1954 Congress passed the Communist Control Act of 1954 which prevented members of the communist party in America from holding office in labor unions and other labor organizations.

Wind down 
Examining the political controversies of the 1940s and 1950s, historian John Earl Haynes, who studied the Venona decryptions extensively, argued that Joseph McCarthy's attempts to "make anti-communism a partisan weapon" actually "threatened [the post-War] anti-Communist consensus", thereby ultimately harming anti-communist efforts more than helping them. Meanwhile, the "shockingly high level" of infiltration by Soviet agents during WWII had largely dissipated by 1950. Liberal anti-communists like Edward Shils and Daniel Moynihan had contempt for McCarthyism, and Moynihan argued that McCarthy's overreaction distracted from the "real (but limited) extent of Soviet espionage in America." In 1950, President Harry Truman called Joseph McCarthy "the greatest asset the Kremlin has." 

In 1954, after accusing the army, including war heroes, Senator Joseph McCarthy lost credibility in the eyes of the American public and the Army-McCarthy Hearings were held in the summer of 1954. He was formally censured by his colleagues in Congress and the hearings led by McCarthy came to a close. After the Senate formally censured McCarthy, his political standing and power were significantly diminished, and much of the tension surrounding the idea of a possible communist takeover died down.

From 1955 through 1959, the Supreme Court made several decisions which restricted the ways in which the government could enforce its anti-communist policies, some of which included limiting the federal loyalty program to only those who had access to sensitive information, allowing defendants to face their accusers, reducing the strength of congressional investigation committees, and weakening the Smith Act.

In the 1957 case Yates v. United States and the 1961 case Scales v. United States, the Supreme Court limited Congress's ability to circumvent the First Amendment, and in 1967 during the Supreme Court case United States v. Robel, the Supreme Court ruled that a ban on communists in the defense industry was unconstitutional.

In 1995, the American government declassified details of the Venona Project following the Moynihan Commission, which when combined with the opening of the USSR Comintern archives, provided substantial validation of intelligence gathering, outright spying, and policy influencing, by Americans on behalf of the Soviet Union, from 1940 through 1980. Over 300 American communists, whether they knew it or not, including government officials and technicians that helped in developing the atom bomb, were found to have engaged in espionage. This allegedly included some pro-Soviet capitalists, such as economist Harry Dexter White and communist businessman David Karr.

New Red Scare 
According to The New York Times, China's growing military and economic power has resulted in a "New Red Scare" in the United States. Both Democrats and Republicans have expressed anti-China sentiment. According to The Economist, the New Red Scare has caused the American and Chinese governments to "increasingly view Chinese students with suspicion" on American college campuses.

The fourth iteration of the Committee on the Present Danger, a United States foreign policy interest group, was established on March 25, 2019, branding itself Committee on the Present Danger: China (CPDC). The CPDC has been criticized as promoting a revival of Red Scare politics in the United States, and for its ties to conspiracy theorist Frank Gaffney and conservative activist Steve Bannon. David Skidmore, writing for The Diplomat, saw it as another instance of "adolescent hysteria" in American diplomacy, as another of the "fevered crusades [which] have produced some of the costliest mistakes in American foreign policy".

See also

 American social policy during the Second Red Scare
 Church Committee
 Cold War
 The Crucible
 Espionage Act of 1917
 Eugene Debs and Debs v. United States
 Fear mongering
 Foley Square trial
 History of Soviet espionage in the United States
 Hollywood blacklist
 Jencks Act
 Jencks v. United States
 Kellock–Taschereau Commission
 Lavender scare
McCarthyism
 Moral panic
 Pentagon military analyst program
 Propaganda in the United States
 Psychological operations (United States)
 The Reagan Doctrine
 The Red Decade
 Red-tagging in the Philippines
 Rooi gevaar ("red danger" in Afrikaans)
 Subversive Activities Control Board
 Terruqueo
 US intervention in Latin America
 Witch-hunt
 Yellow Peril

References

Further reading
 K. A. Cuordileone, "The Torment of Secrecy: Reckoning with Communism and Anti-Communism After Venona", Diplomatic History, vol. 35, no. 4 (Sept. 2011), pp. 615–642.
 Albert Fried, McCarthyism, the Great American Red Scare: A Documentary History. New York: Oxford University Press, 1997
 Joy Hakim, War, Peace, and All That Jazz. New York: Oxford University Press, 1995.
 John Earl Haynes, Red Scare or Red Menace?: American Communism and Anti Communism in the Cold War Era. Ivan R. Dee, 2000.
 John Earl Haynes and Harvey Klehr, Venona: Decoding Soviet Espionage in America. Cambridge, MA: Yale University Press, 2000.
 Murray B. Levin, Political Hysteria in America: The Democratic Capacity for Repression. New York: Basic Books, 1972.
 Rodger McDaniel, Dying for Joe McCarthy's Sins. Cody, Wyo.: WordsWorth, 2013. 
 Ted Morgan, Reds: McCarthyism in Twentieth-Century America. New York: Random House, 2004.
 
 Richard Gid Powers, Not Without Honor: A History of American Anti-Communism. New York: Free Press, 1997.
 
 Ellen Schrecker, Many Are the Crimes: McCarthyism in America. Boston: Little, Brown, 1998.
 Landon R. Y. Storrs, The Second Red Scare and the Unmaking of the New Deal Left. Princeton, NJ: Princeton University Press, 2012.
 William M. Wiecek, "The Legal Foundations of Domestic Anticommunism: The Background of Dennis v. United States, Supreme Court Review, vol. 2001 (2001), pp. 375–434. .

External links

 "Political Tests for Professors: Academic Freedom during the McCarthy Years" by Ellen Schrecker, The University Loyalty Oath, October 7, 1999.

 
Aftermath of World War II in the United States
Anti-Chinese sentiment in the United States
Anti-communism in the Philippines
Anti-communism in the United States
Anti-Russian sentiment
China–United States relations
Communism in the United States
Far-left politics in the United States
History of the Communist Party USA
History of the Industrial Workers of the World
History of the Socialist Party of America
Political and cultural purges
Political history of the United States
Political repression in the Philippines
Political repression in the United States
Scares
Socialism in the United States
Soviet Union–United States relations